Zane Goddard (born 13 October 1999) is an Australian professional racing driver competing in the Repco Supercars Championship. He currently drives for Triple Eight Race Engineering as a co-driver alongside Craig Lowndes in the No. 888 Chevrolet Camaro.

Racing record

Career summary

Complete F4 British Championship results 
(key) (Races in bold indicate pole position; races in italics indicate fastest lap)

Complete Formula Renault Eurocup results 
(key) (Races in bold indicate pole position; races in italics indicate fastest lap)

Supercars Championship results

Complete Bathurst 1000 results

Complete S5000 results

References

External links
 Zane Goddard V8 Supercars Official Profile
Driver Database profile
Profile on Racing Reference

Australian racing drivers
1999 births
Living people
Arden International drivers
Supercars Championship drivers
British F4 Championship drivers
Formula Renault Eurocup drivers
Double R Racing drivers
Matt Stone Racing drivers
Australian F4 Championship drivers